Albania participated in the Eurovision Song Contest 2021 in Rotterdam, the Netherlands, with the song "Karma" performed by Anxhela Peristeri. Prior to the contest, the song was promoted by a music video and various television and radio appearances in Albania, Greece, Kosovo and San Marino.

Albania was drawn to compete in the second semi-final of the Eurovision Song Contest, which took place on 20 May 2021. Performing as number 11, the nation was announced among the top 10 entries of the second semi-final and therefore qualified to compete in the grand final. In the grand final on 22 May 2021, it performed as number two and placed 21st out of the 26 participating countries, scoring 57 points.

Background 

The first entry was performed by Anjeza Shahini with the song "The Image of You" and finished in the seventh place, Albania's second-highest placing to date. In September 2020, the national broadcaster of Albania,  (RTSH), officially confirmed Albania's participation in the Eurovision Song Contest 2021 in Rotterdam, the Netherlands. RTSH broadcasts the contest within Albania and organises the selection process for the nation's entry. Since its debut in 2004, it has consistently selected its entry through the long-standing competition .

Before Eurovision

Festivali i Këngës 

The competition consisted of two semi-finals on 21 and 22 December, respectively, and the final on 23 December 2020. The three shows took place at the Italy Square in Tirana instead of the Palace of Congresses (the regular venue of the festival) due to COVID-19 restrictions, and were hosted by Albanian actress Jonida Vokshi and host Blendi Salaj. From August 2020 to 2 October 2020, interested artists were able to submit their entries to the broadcaster. An artistic committee, consisting of Agim Doçi, Alma Bektashi, Eugent Bushpepa, Jonida Maliqi and Klodian Qafoku, reviewed the received submissions and chose 26 artists and songs shortlisted to compete in the semi-finals of Festivali i Këngës. On 16 November, RTSH released all of the competing songs on its official YouTube channel.

Contestants

Shows

Semi-finals 

The two semi-finals of Festivali i Këngës took place on 21 December and 22 December 2020 and were broadcast at 21:00 (CET) on the respective dates. As a result of the ongoing pandemic of coronavirus disease 2019 (COVID-19), the performances of the semi-finals and final were pre-recorded prior to the scheduled dates. During the first semi-final, the competing participants performed the official studio version of their entries, while on the second semi-final, they presented their acoustic versions. Prior to the second semi-final, the votes of an expert jury panel selected eighteen songs to advance to the final.

Final 

The final of  took place on 23 December 2020 and was broadcast at 21:00 (CET). 18 songs competed and the winner was determined by the combination of the votes from a seven-member jury panel consisting of Andri Xhahu, Kastriot Çaushi, Prec Zogaj, Rame Lahaj, Robert Radoja, Vasil Tole and Zana Shuteriqi. Before the end of the show, Anxhela Peristeri with "Karma" emerged as the winner of the competition and was simultaneously announced as the country's representative for the Eurovision Song Contest 2021.

Key:
 Winner
 Second place
 Third place

Promotion 

A music video for "Karma" premiered on the official YouTube channel of the Eurovision Song Contest on 1 March 2021 at 20:00 (CET). Her promotional phase on European television and radio stations continued on Greek Hellenic Broadcasting Corporation (ERT) and Open TV as well as on Sammarinese RTV. For further promotion, Peristeri also performed the song during the virtual concerts in the British Wiwi Jam, Croatian Adriatic Pre Party and Spanish PrePartyES.

Live-on-tape performance 

As according to the European Broadcasting Union's (EBU) prevention plan against a COVID-19-cancellation of the Eurovision Song Contest 2021, each participant was required to record a live-on-tape performance of their planned entry in a location of their choice prior to the event. The tape was set to be broadcast during the live shows of the contest in case the artist was unable to travel to the contest venue to perform their song due to pandemic restrictions or related reasons. A large portion of the mostly unused live-on-tape performances, including Peristeri's, were unveiled after the contest on 28 May and 29 May 2021 as part of Eurovision Song Celebration shows.

At Eurovision 

The Eurovision Song Contest 2021 took place at Rotterdam Ahoy in Rotterdam, the Netherlands, and consisted of two semi-finals held on the respective dates of 18 and 20 May and the grand final on 22 May 2021. On 17 November 2020, the European Broadcasting Union (EBU) confirmed that the semi-final allocation draw for the 2021 contest would not be held. Instead, the semi-finals featured the same line-up of countries as determined by the draw for the cancelled 2020 contest, which was held on 28 January 2020 at the Rotterdam City Hall. Albania was drawn to participate in the second half of the second semi-final, which was held on 20 May 2021.

Once all the competing songs for the 2021 contest had been released, the running order for the semi-finals was decided by the producers of the contest rather than through another draw, to prevent similar songs from being placed next to each other. Albania was set to perform at position 11, succeeding  and preceding . At the end of the semi-final, the nation was announced among the top 10 entries and therefore qualified to compete in the grand final. The results of the show were determined by a 50/50 combination of votes from each participating country's professional jury panel and public televote. Soon after, it was announced that Albania would be performing second in the grand final, succeeding  and preceding .

Voting 

Voting during the three shows involved each country awarding two sets of points from 1–8, 10 and 12: one from their professional jury and the other from televoting. Each nation's jury consisted of five music industry professionals who are citizens of the country they represent, with a diversity in gender and age represented. The judges assess each entry based on the performances during the second Dress Rehearsal of each show, which takes place the night before each live show, against a set of criteria including vocal capacity; the stage performance; the song's composition and originality; and the overall impression by the act. Jury members may only take part in panel once every three years, and are obliged to confirm that they are not connected to any of the participating acts in a way that would impact their ability to vote impartially. Jury members should also vote independently, with no discussion of their vote permitted with other jury members. The exact composition of the professional jury, and the results of each country's jury and televoting were released after the grand final; the individual results from each jury member were also released in an anonymised form.

The tables below visualise a breakdown of points awarded to Albania in the second semi-final and final of the Eurovision Song Contest 2021, as well as by the nation on both occasions.

Points awarded to Albania

Points awarded by Albania

Detailed voting results 
The following members comprised the Albanian jury:
 Aurel Thellimi
 Kastriot Tusha
 Kejsi Tola
 Rozana Radi
 Sokol Marsi

Notes

References 

2021
Countries in the Eurovision Song Contest 2021
Eurovision
Eurovision